Chase Young (born April 14, 1999) is an American football defensive end for the Washington Commanders of the National Football League (NFL). A native of Maryland, he played college football at Ohio State University for the Buckeyes. During his junior season in 2019, Young broke the school's single-season sack record with 16.5 and was named a unanimous All-American and the recipient of several defensive player of the year awards. He was also named the Big Ten Male Athlete of the Year and was a finalist for the Heisman Trophy, a rare accomplishment for a defensive player.

Young declared for the 2020 NFL Draft following that season and was considered by many to be its best overall prospect before being selected second overall by Washington. He was named the NFL's Defensive Rookie of the Year and made the Pro Bowl after leading all rookies in several statistical categories in 2020, including sacks and forced fumbles. His 2021 season was seen as a disappointment after he recorded just 1.5 sacks prior to suffering a major knee injury halfway through, leading to a lengthy recovery before returning by the end of the 2022 season.

Early life and high school
Young was born in Upper Marlboro, Maryland, on April 14, 1999. He began playing American football as a child, attending St. Columba School in Oxon Hill, Maryland, before attending St. Vincent Pallotti High School in Laurel, Maryland, in 2013. As a freshman there, he played as a quarterback, tight end, and outside linebacker before switching primarily to defensive end later that year. Young and the team won the Maryland Interscholastic Athletic Association C-conference championship in 2014. He was also a member of the school's choir, playing the piano, saxophone, and violin.

In 2015, Young transferred to DeMatha Catholic High School in Hyattsville, Maryland, where he had 19 quarterback sacks and 27 tackles for loss that season that helped the team win the Washington Catholic Athletic Conference (WCAC) championship. He was invited to The Opening in July 2016, a college football recruiting camp sponsored by Nike, where he was named MVP at his position. As a senior in 2016, he had 19 sacks, 118 tackles, five forced fumbles, and two defensive touchdowns that helped the team go undefeated and win another WCAC championship.

By then, he was recognized as one of the best high school football players in the nation when he was included on the 2016 USA Today All-USA team and named all-metropolitan defensive football player of the year by The Washington Post. Young was also invited to the International Bowl and All-American Bowl, playing on the East team for the latter. Young also played for DeMatha's basketball team, playing alongside Markelle Fultz who was later selected first overall in the 2017 NBA draft. At the time, both he and Fultz had set goals to become the first overall selections in their respective sports.

College career

Young received scholarship offers from over 40 universities before committing to Ohio State in July 2016 to play for the Buckeyes, choosing them over schools such as Alabama and Maryland due to their family-oriented approach and his desire to play under defensive line coach Larry Johnson. Young recorded 3.5 sacks, 18 tackles, and a forced fumble as a freshman in 2017. He became a starter during his sophomore season, with him recording 10.5 sacks for the year despite spraining both ankles halfway through. Three of them came against Northwestern in the 2018 Big Ten Football Championship Game. He was named second-team All-Big Ten for his performance.

Young was named one of the team captains as a junior in 2019. That year, he tied Ohio State school records for single-game sacks (4) and tackles for loss (5) in a win against Wisconsin. In November 2019, Young was suspended for two games by the NCAA for getting an unauthorized loan from a family friend to allegedly help his girlfriend attend the 2019 Rose Bowl, which he later repaid in full. In his first game after being reinstated, Young recorded three sacks against Penn State. He ended the season with 16.5 sacks, 46 tackles, 21 tackles for loss, 7 forced fumbles, 3 pass deflections, and a blocked field goal. His 16.5 sacks broke the single-season school record previously held by Vernon Gholston, who had 14 in 2007.

In addition to being unanimously named to the 2019 College Football All-America Team, he won several other awards and honors that season including the Bronko Nagurski Trophy, Chuck Bednarik Award, Ted Hendricks Award, Chicago Tribune Silver Football, Nagurski–Woodson Defensive Player of the Year, and Smith–Brown Defensive Lineman of the Year. He was also named a finalist for the Walter Camp Award, Maxwell Award, and Heisman Trophy, becoming only the ninth defensive player since 1982 to be nominated for the latter, where he finished fourth in voting behind quarterbacks Joe Burrow, Jalen Hurts, and Justin Fields. Young was also voted the Big Ten Jesse Owens Athlete of the Year, which annually honors the Big Ten Conference's top male athlete of any sport. He was the seventh football player to win it since its inception in 1982 and the first since Ron Dayne in 2000. Young finished his career at Ohio State with 30.5 sacks in three seasons, which ranks second all-time there behind Mike Vrabel, who had 36 in four. He was later named to the Big Ten Network's 2010s All-Decade Team as the only unanimous selection.

Professional career

Young decided to forgo his senior year at Ohio State by declaring for the 2020 NFL Draft, where he was considered to be the best overall prospect by many in the media. He attended the NFL Combine but did not participate in any workouts or drills, stating that he did not want to waste time being a "combine athlete". Young was one of 58 players invited to the draft, which was held virtually due to social distancing regulations arising from the COVID-19 pandemic. He was selected second overall by the Washington Redskins. He signed his four-year rookie contract, worth 34.56 million, on July 23, 2020.

Young was considered the favorite to win the NFL Defensive Rookie of the Year award during the lead up to the season. In his debut, he had 1.5 sacks, four tackles, and a forced fumble in a win against the Philadelphia Eagles. He suffered a mild groin strain against the Cleveland Browns in Week 3 and missed the following game against the Baltimore Ravens. In a Week 14 game against the San Francisco 49ers, he recorded a sack, two passes defended, a forced fumble, and a fumble recovery which he returned 47 yards for a touchdown, becoming the first rookie in NFL history and only the third player since 1999 to achieve all of that in a single game. Young finished the season with 7.5 sacks, which led all rookies, as well as four forced fumbles and three fumble recoveries.

In December 2020, Young was named a team captain and was voted the NFC's Defensive Player of the Month for the month, becoming the first rookie in Washington's history to receive that distinction. He was named Defensive Rookie of the Year by the Associated Press and Pro Football Writers of America (PFWA), and was the only rookie included on PFWA's all-conference team. Young was also one of only two rookies named to the 2021 Pro Bowl alongside Justin Jefferson of the Minnesota Vikings. He was also nominated for the Best Breakthrough Athlete Award at the 2021 ESPYs, which went to NBA player LaMelo Ball, and was ranked 61st on the NFL Top 100 Players of 2021 list.

Young's followup season in 2021 saw him record 21 tackles, 1.5 sacks, and two forced fumbles before tearing his anterior cruciate ligament (ACL) and patellar tendon in his right knee during a Week 10 game against the Tampa Bay Buccaneers. To reconstruct his ACL, the surgery included grafting part of the patellar tendon from his other knee, which led to additional recovery time. The season was considered a disappointment by many sportswriters, who expected him to have taken a step forward in his development.

Young was placed on the physically unable to perform list at the start of training camp in 2022. He returned to the active roster on November 21, 2022, but sat out the following three games before making his return against the 49ers in Week 16.

Career statistics

Personal life
Young's father Greg played college basketball at Bowie State University before working as a deputy sheriff with the Arlington County Sheriff's Office, while his mother Carla works for the Office of Investigations for the United States Department of Transportation. He has a sister, Weslie, who played college basketball at North Carolina Wesleyan.

Young pursued a major in criminology at Ohio State after being inspired by his father and several of his uncles and cousins, who have all worked in law enforcement. He was also nicknamed "The Predator" during his time with the Buckeyes for his on-field performance and how his dreadlocks resembled Predators from the Predator franchise.

Young is represented by the Klutch Sports Group agency. He has appeared in advertisements for Chipotle, Under Armour, and eBay, as well as on episodes of The Shop and Celebrity Family Feud. Young also performed guest vocals on "Fire & Ice", a track from the American rapper Wale's 2021 album Folarin II. He was the honorary pace car driver for the 2022 Federated Auto Parts 400, a NASCAR Cup Series race held in Richmond, Virginia.

References

External links

 
 Washington Commanders bio
 Ohio State Buckeyes bio

1999 births
21st-century African-American sportspeople
African-American players of American football
All-American college football players
American football defensive ends
Big Ten Athlete of the Year winners
DeMatha Catholic High School alumni
Living people
National Conference Pro Bowl players
National Football League Defensive Rookie of the Year Award winners
Ohio State Buckeyes football players
People from Upper Marlboro, Maryland
Players of American football from Maryland
Sportspeople from the Washington metropolitan area
Washington Commanders players
Washington Football Team players